Wente Vineyards is a winery in Livermore, California, that is "the oldest continuously operating, family-owned winery in the United States." The Wente Estate is registered as a California Historical Landmark #957.

History
The winery was established by C.H. Wente in 1883 on 47 acres of land. Having received training in wines while working for Charles Krug of Napa Valley, Wente purchased a few vineyards and land of excellent soil. In 1934 his sons, Ernest and Herman, introduced California's first varietal wine label, Sauvignon Blanc. In 1936, they introduced the first varietally labeled Chardonnay. The efforts of the Wente family, including pioneering night-time mechanical harvesting and being a leader in sustainable winegrowing practices, have helped establish the Livermore Valley as one of the premier wine-growing areas of California. Since then, it has expanded to over 2,000 acres (8 km²), plus an additional 700 acres (3 km²) in Arroyo Seco.

Wente Clone
The Wente clone is budwood that is used to plant Chardonnay at many California vineyards. In 1912, 2nd Generation Winegrower Ernest Wente took cuttings from the University of Montpellier viticultural nursery in France. Cuttings from the Wente vineyard then spread to a number of other wineries before eventually being certified by the Foundation Plant Materials Service of the University of California, Davis. Clones taken from the certified vines are known as "Wente" or "heat-treated Wente," and clones taken from vines before certification are known as "Old Wente."

Estate
Wente Vineyards also offers a golf course, tasting room and private events all nestled in the heart of the vineyards.

References

Footnotes

External links

Wente Vineyards official site
Wente Country Championship Golf

1883 establishments in California
California Historical Landmarks
Wineries in Livermore Valley
Companies based in Livermore, California
Family-owned companies of the United States